Ferdinand Porsche (3 September 1875 – 30 January 1951) was an Austro-Bohemian automotive engineer and founder of the Porsche AG. He is best known for creating the first gasoline–electric hybrid vehicle (Lohner–Porsche), the Volkswagen Beetle, the Auto Union racing car, the Mercedes-Benz SS/SSK, several other important developments and Porsche automobiles.

An important contributor to the German war effort during World War II, Porsche was involved in the production of advanced tanks such as the VK 4501 (P), the Elefant (initially called "Ferdinand") self-propelled gun, and the Panzer VIII Maus super-heavy tank, as well as other weapon systems, including the V-1 flying bomb. Porsche was a member of the Nazi Party and an officer of the Schutzstaffel (SS). He was a recipient of the German National Prize for Art and Science, the SS-Ehrenring and the War Merit Cross.

Porsche was inducted into the International Motorsports Hall of Fame in 1996 and was named the Car Engineer of the Century in 1999.

Early life

Ferdinand Porsche was born to Anna Porsche (née Ehrlich) and Anton Porsche, in Maffersdorf (Vratislavice nad Nisou) in northern Bohemia, part of Austria-Hungary at that time, and today part of the Czech Republic. Ferdinand was his parents' third child. His father was a master panel-beater.

Ferdinand showed a great aptitude for technology and was especially intrigued by electricity from a young age. Thanks to a referral, Porsche landed a job with the Béla Egger & Co. Electrical company in Vienna (later Brown Boveri, now ABB), and moved there in 1893, at the young age of 18. While working in Vienna, he enrolled as a part-time student at what is now the Vienna University of Technology, and went there whenever he could after work. Besides attending classes there, Porsche did not complete any formal engineering education.

After the breakup of the Austro-Hungarian Empire at the end of World War I, he chose Czechoslovak citizenship. In 1934, either Adolf Hitler or Joseph Goebbels made Porsche a naturalized German citizen.

Early career

In 1897 or 1898, Porsche joined the Vienna-based factory Jakob Lohner & Company, which produced coaches for Emperor Franz Joseph I of Austria as well as for the monarchs of the UK, Sweden, and Romania. Jakob Lohner had begun construction of automobiles in 1896 under Ludwig Lohner in the trans-Danubian suburb of Floridsdorf. Their first design — unveiled in Vienna, Austria, on 26 June 1898 — was the Egger–Lohner vehicle (also referred to as the C.2 Phaeton).

The Egger–Lohner was a carriage-like car driven by two electric motors within the front wheel hubs, powered by batteries. This drivetrain construction was easily expanded to four-wheel drive, by mounting two more electric motors to the rear wheels, and a four-motor example was ordered by Englishman E. W. Hart in 1900. In December that year, the car was displayed at the Paris World Exhibition under the name Toujours-Contente. Even though this one-off vehicle had been commissioned for the purposes of racing and record-breaking, its  of lead–acid batteries was a severe shortcoming. Though it "showed wonderful speed when it was allowed to sprint", the weight of the batteries rendered it slow to climb hills. It also suffered from limited range due to limited battery life.

Still employed by Lohner, Porsche introduced the "Lohner–Porsche Mixte Hybrid" in 1901: instead of a massive battery-pack, an internal combustion engine built by the German firm Daimler drove a generator which in turn drove the electric wheel hub motors. As a backup a small battery pack was fitted. This is the first petroleum-electric hybrid vehicle on record. Since sufficiently reliable gears and couplings were not available at the time, he chose to make it a series-hybrid, an arrangement now more common in diesel–electric or turbo-electric railway locomotives than in automobiles.

Though over 300 Lohner–Porsche chassis were sold up to 1906, most of them were two-wheel drive; either front- or rear-wheel driven trucks, buses and fire-engines. Some four wheel drive buses were produced, but no four wheel drive automobiles.

It was later upgraded with more powerful engines from Daimler and Panhard, which proved to be enough to gain more speed records. In 1905 Porsche was awarded the Pötting prize as Austria's most outstanding automotive engineer.

In 1902, he was drafted into military service. He served as a chauffeur to Archduke Franz Ferdinand of Austria, the crown prince of Austria whose assassination has been credited with contributing to the start of WWI.

Austro-Daimler
In 1906, Austro-Daimler recruited Porsche as their chief designer. Porsche's best known Austro-Daimler car was designed for the Prince Henry Trial in 1910, named after Wilhelm II's younger brother Prince Heinrich of Prussia. Examples of this streamlined, 85 horsepower (63 kW) car won the first three places, and the car is still better known by the nickname "Prince Henry" than by its model name "Modell 27/80". He also created a 30 horsepower model called the Maja, named after Mercedes Jellinek's younger sister, Andrée Maja (or Maia) Jellinek.

Porsche had advanced to managing director by 1916 and received an honorary doctorate from the Vienna University of Technology in 1916: the title "Dr. Ing. h.c." is an abbreviation of "Doktor Ingenieur Honoris Causa". Porsche successfully continued to construct racing cars, winning 43 out of 53 races with his 1922 design. In 1923, Porsche left Austro-Daimler after differences ensued about the future direction of car development.

A few months later Daimler Motoren Gesellschaft hired Porsche to serve as Technical Director in Stuttgart, Germany, which was already a major center for the German automotive industry. In 1924, he received another honorary doctorate from the Stuttgart Technical University for his work at Daimler Motoren Gesellschaft in Stuttgart and was later given the honorary title of Professor. While at Daimler Motoren Gesellschaft he came up with several very successful race car designs. The series of models equipped with superchargers that culminated in the Mercedes-Benz SSK dominated its class of motor racing in the 1920s.

In 1926, Daimler Motoren Gesellschaft and Benz & Cie merged into Daimler-Benz, with their joint products beginning to be called Mercedes-Benz. However, Porsche's ideas for a small, light-weight Mercedes-Benz car was not popular with Daimler-Benz's board. He left in 1929 for Steyr Automobile, but due to the Great Depression Porsche ended up being made redundant.

Founding of Porsche

In April 1931, Porsche returned to Stuttgart and founded his consulting firm Dr. Ing. h.c. F. Porsche GmbH, Konstruktionen und Beratungen für Motoren und Fahrzeugbau (designs and consulting services for motors and vehicles). With financial backing from his son-in-law the Austrian attorney Anton Piëch and Adolf Rosenberger, Porsche successfully recruited several former co-workers he had befriended at his former places of employment, including Karl Rabe, Erwin Komenda, Franz Xaver Reimspiess, and his son, Ferry Porsche.

Their first project was the design of a middle class car for Wanderer. Other commissioned designs followed. As the business grew, Porsche decided to work on his own design as well, which was a development of the small car concept from his days at Daimler-Benz in Stuttgart. He financed the project with a loan on his life insurance. Later Zündapp decided to help sponsor the project, but lost interest after their success with motorcycles. NSU then took over the sponsorship, but also lost interest due to the high tooling costs.

With car commissions scarce due to the depressed economic climate, Porsche founded a subsidiary company, Hochleistungs Motor GmbH (High Performance Engines Ltd.), to develop a racing car for which he had no customer. Based on Max Wagner's mid-engined layout the 1923 Benz Tropfenwagen, or "Teardrop" aerodynamic design, the experimental P-Wagen project racing car (P stood for Porsche) was designed according to the regulations of the 750 kg formula. The main regulation of this formula was that the weight of the car without driver, fuel, oil, water and tires was not allowed to exceed .

In 1932, Auto Union Gmbh was formed, consisting of struggling auto manufacturers Audi, DKW, Horch and Wanderer. The chairman of the Board of Directors, Baron Klaus von Oertzen wanted a showpiece project, so at fellow director Adolf Rosenberger's insistence, von Oertzen met with Porsche, who had done work for him before.

These projects led to two projects for Porsche, and set a precedent for the rest of the decade, with Porsche undertaking further projects for the German Government, including the Tiger tank and the Elefant tank destroyer.

Volkswagen Beetle and Government Commission

In June 1934, Porsche received a contract from Hitler to design a people's car (or "Volkswagen"), following on from his previous designs such as the 1931 Type 12 car designed for Zündapp. The first two prototypes were completed in 1935. These were followed by several further pre-production batches during 1936 to 1939. The car was similar to the contemporary designs of Hans Ledwinka of Tatra, in particular the Tatra V570 and Tatra 97. This resulted in a lawsuit against Porsche claiming infringement of Tatra's patents regarding air-cooling of the rear engine. The suit was interrupted by the German invasion of Czechoslovakia: several years after World War II Volkswagen paid a settlement.

Since being engaged by the National-Socialist authorities in building the Volksauto, Porsche was praised as the Great German Engineer. Hitler considered Czechs subhuman and Porsche was urged to apply for German citizenship in 1934. A few days later, he indeed filed a declaration giving up the Czechoslovak citizenship at a Czechoslovak consulate in Stuttgart. In 1937, he joined the Nazi Party (becoming member no. 5,643,287) as well as the SS. By 1938, he was using the SS as security personnel and drivers at his factory, and later set up a special unit called SS Sturmwerk Volkswagen. In 1942, he reached the rank of SS-Oberführer, and during the war, he was further decorated with the SS-Ehrenring and awarded the War Merit Cross. As the war progressed his proposed solutions to new developments became more complex and he gained a reputation in certain circles as a "mad scientist" especially with Albert Speer (mainly due to his newfound affinity for "pointy" designs).

A new city, "Stadt des KdF-Wagens" was founded near Fallersleben for the Volkswagen factory, but wartime production concentrated almost exclusively on the military Kübelwagen and Schwimmwagen variants. Mass production of the car, which later became known as the Beetle, began after the end of the war. The city is named Wolfsburg today and is still the headquarters of the Volkswagen Group.

Auto Union racing car

German racing driver Hans Stuck had met Hitler before he became Chancellor, and not being able to gain a seat at Mercedes, accepted the invitation of Rosenberger to join him, von Oertzen and Porsche in approaching the Chancellor. This highly annoyed Mercedes, who had already developed their Mercedes-Benz W25, and resulted in a heated exchange both on and off the racing track between the two companies for the period until World War II.

As Porsche became more involved with the construction of the Wolfsburg factory, he handed over his racing projects to his son, Ferry. The dominance of the Silver Arrows of both brands was only stopped by the outbreak of World War II in 1939.

Military vehicles
Porsche produced a heavy tank design in 1942, the VK4501 also known as "Tiger (P)". Due to the complex nature of the drive system, a competing design from Henschel was chosen for production instead. Ninety chassis that had already been built were converted into self-propelled anti-tank guns; these were put into service in 1943 as the Panzerjäger Tiger (P) and known by the nickname "Ferdinand".

The Ferdinand was driven by a hybrid electric powertrain, and was armed with a long barrel development of the 88mm anti-aircraft gun. The most common reason for losses was because the vehicle became stuck or broke down, and so the crews often had to destroy their own vehicles to avoid allowing them to be captured. It had a kill ratio of nearly 10:1, but as with most German wartime vehicles, lack of supplies made maintenance a serious problem, reducing the effectiveness of the vehicles, and forcing crews to destroy many otherwise operational vehicles.

Post war
In November 1945, Porsche was asked to continue the design of the Volkswagen in France and to move the factory equipment there as part of war reparations. Whilst in France, Porsche was also asked to consult on the design/manufacture of the upcoming Renault 4CV, which led to serious conflict with the recently appointed head of Renault, the former resistance hero, Pierre Lefaucheux. Differences within the French government and objections from the French automotive industry put a halt to the Volkswagen project before it had even begun. On 15 December 1945, French authorities arrested Porsche, Anton Piëch, and Ferry Porsche as war criminals, under rightful suspicion of collaboration as personal friends of the former fuhrer. While Ferry was freed after 6 months, Ferdinand and Anton were imprisoned first in Baden-Baden and then in Paris and Dijon.

While his father was in captivity, Ferry worked diligently to keep the company in business; and developing a business for the repair of automobiles, water pumps, and winches. A contract with Piero Dusio was completed for a Grand Prix motor racing car, the Type 360 Cisitalia. The innovative 4WD design never raced.

The legal circumstances of Piëch and Porsche's imprisonment and trial could be largely apportioned to Ferdinand Porsche's contribution to his country's war effort and personal friendship with Hitler. In the Porsche family's own account, the affair was a thinly veiled attempt at extorting money and forcing them to collaborate with Renault. But the family was deceptive about the use of forced labor and the size of their wartime operation. It was later shown that approximately 300 forced laborers were employed, including Poles and Russians. During the war, it was common practice for German factories of this size (about 1000 workers) to use what was essentially slave labor, often with Slavic prisoners of war, who were frequently worked to death. The post-war French government required a payment of one million francs, variously described as ransom or bail, for the release of Piëch and Porsche. Initially unable to obtain this amount of money, the family eventually raised it through their contract with Cisitalia. During a trial, witnesses were brought forward to testify that no French prisoners had been imported to work at the plant.

In addition to its work with Cisitalia, the company also started work on a new design, the Porsche 356, the first car to carry the Porsche brand name. The company then was located in Gmünd in Carinthia, where they had relocated from Stuttgart to avoid Allied bombing. The company started manufacturing the Porsche 356 in an old saw mill in Gmünd. They made only 49 cars, which were built entirely by hand.

Return to Stuttgart
The Porsche family returned to Stuttgart in 1949 not knowing how to restart their business. While the banks would not give them credit, as the company's plant was still under American embargo and could not serve as collateral, they did still possess considerable resources. So Ferry Porsche took one of the limited series 356 models from Gmünd and visited Volkswagen dealers to raise some orders. He asked the dealers to pay for the ordered cars in advance.

The series production version made in Stuttgart had a steel body, welded to the central-tube platform chassis, instead of the aluminium body used in the initial limited Gmünd-made series. When Ferry Porsche resurrected the company he counted on series production figures of about 1,500. More than 78,000 Porsche 356s were manufactured in the following 17 years.

Porsche was later contracted by Volkswagen for additional consulting work and received a royalty on every Volkswagen Beetle manufactured. This provided Porsche with a comfortable income as more than 20 million Type I were built.

In November 1950, Porsche visited the Wolfsburg Volkswagen factory for the first time since the end of World War II. Porsche spent his visit chatting with Volkswagen president Heinrich Nordhoff about the future of VW Beetles, which were already being produced in large numbers.

A few weeks later, Porsche suffered a stroke. He did not fully recover, and died on 30 January 1951.

In 1996, Porsche was inducted into the International Motorsports Hall of Fame and in 1999 posthumously won the award of Car Engineer of the Century.

Views on labor
Porsche visited Henry Ford's operation in Detroit many times where he learned the importance of productivity. There he learned to monitor work. He was also surprised at how the workers and the managers treated each other as equals; even he, as a visiting dignitary, had to carry his own tray in the cafeteria and eat with the workers.

The need to increase productivity became a primary interest of Porsche's. Conventional methods for increasing productivity included longer working hours, a faster rate of work, and new labour-saving techniques. Originally, the Volkswagen project was to be a collaboration of the existing German auto manufacturers, but they bowed out of the project, and a complete workforce was needed. The Volkswagen plant was completed in 1938 after Italian labour was brought in. Volkswagen, under Ferdinand Porsche, profited from forced labour. This included a large number of Soviets. By early 1945, German nationals only made up 10% of Volkswagen's workforce.

Controversy in Porsche's birthplace
Following protests from local World War II survivors that Porsche's Czech birthplace Vratislavice nad Nisou was promoting Nazism by displaying signs commemorating its native son, in 2013 the town authorities removed the signs and changed the content of a local exhibition so that it would cover not only his automotive achievements, but also his Nazi party and SS membership, and the importance of his work for the Nazi war cause. The move was criticized by the local association of Porsche car owners as silly and intent on smearing the name of Porsche. Moreover, Porsche AG removed cars that it had previously provided for the museum.

Notes

See also
 Arthur Constantin Krebs, managing director of Panhard with whom Ferdinand Porsche designed a hybrid car.

References

 - Total pages: 160

Further reading

 Barber, Chris (2003). Birth of the Beetle: The Development of the Volkswagen by Ferdinand Porsche. Haynes Publishing. .
  
 Hiott, Andrea: "Thinking Small: The Long Strange Trip of the Volkswagen Beetle." Random House, 2012, .
 Ludvigsen, Karl E. (2008). Porsche: Excellence Was Expected – The Comprehensive History of the Company, Its Cars and Its Racing Heritage. Brooklands Books. 
 
 Hans Mommsen; Manfred Grieger: Das Volkswagenwerk und seine Arbeiter im Dritten Reich, ECON Verlag, Düsseldorf 1996,  
 Peter Müller: Ferdinand Porsche. Der Vater des Volkswagens, 4. Aufl., 1998 
 Martin Pfundner: Austro Daimler und Steyr. Rivalen bis zur Fusion. Die frühen Jahre des Ferdinand Porsche. Böhlau, Wien 2007.

External links

 
 West Ham's Cedes Stoll Trolleybus Porsche design
 Website of the Society of Automotive Historians about him
 Hybrid-Vehicle.org: The Lohner–Porsche 
 Hybrid-Vehicle.org: The Landwehr and C-train 
 

 
1875 births
1951 deaths
Austrian automobile designers
German automotive pioneers
Czech automobile designers
German automobile designers
Czech automotive engineers
German Bohemian people
German founders of automobile manufacturers
20th-century German inventors
German industrialists
German prisoners of war in World War II held by France
International Motorsports Hall of Fame inductees
Naturalized citizens of Germany
Nazi Party members
People from Liberec
Ferdinand
Recipients of the Knights Cross of the War Merit Cross
SS-Oberführer
Volkswagen Group people
Automotive businesspeople
19th-century German inventors